Haley Winn (born July 14, 2003) is an American ice hockey defenceman for Clarkson and member of the United States women's national ice hockey team.

Playing career
Winn attended Selects Academy at Bishop Kearney for four seasons. Winn began her collegiate career for Clarkson during the 2021–22 NCAA season, where she recorded seven goals and 16 assists in 37 games. She made her debut on September 24, 2021, in a game against Sacred Heart and recorded her first collegiate goal in the first period. She was named the ECAC Rookie of the Month for the month of November 2021. She led the team in minutes and recorded two game-winning-goals and seven assists in eight games.

International play
Winn represented the United States at the 2019 IIHF World Women's U18 Championship where she recorded three assists in five games and won a silver medal. She again represented the United States at the 2020 IIHF World Women's U18 Championship where she recorded one assist in five games and won a gold medal. 

On October 25, 2022, she was named to the roster for the Canada–United States women's national ice hockey rivalry series, where she will make her senior national team debut.

Career statistics

Regular season and playoffs

International

References

External links

2003 births
Living people
American women's ice hockey defensemen
Clarkson Golden Knights women's ice hockey players
Ice hockey people from New York (state)
Sportspeople from Rochester, New York
21st-century American women